Chimmanakali is an art form of Pulaya of north Kerala, south India. Chimmanam should mean humor or chat. Chimmanakali is associated with Garbhabali known as Kannal Kalampattu. The song sung for this play is known as chothiyum pidiym pattu. Very often speeches braced with humor are held. The incidents are dramatized and presented. Chimmanakali essentially is a satirical form of art performed to point out evils of society.

See also
 Pulayan
 Arts of Kerala
 Kerala Folklore Academy

Dances of India
Culture of Kerala